Roebling Machine Shop is located in Trenton, Mercer County, New Jersey, United States. The building was built in 1890 and added to the National Register of Historic Places on September 4, 1997.

See also

John A. Roebling's Sons Company, Trenton N.J., Block 3
National Register of Historic Places listings in Mercer County, New Jersey
John A. Roebling

References

1890s architecture in the United States
Buildings and structures in Trenton, New Jersey
Industrial buildings completed in 1890
Industrial buildings and structures on the National Register of Historic Places in New Jersey
National Register of Historic Places in Trenton, New Jersey
New Jersey Register of Historic Places
Wire and cable manufacturers
Roebling family